Benito Juárez is an outdoor bronze sculpture of Benito Juárez by Moises Cabrera Orozco, located in Bryant Park in Manhattan, New York. Donated by the State of Oaxaca on behalf of the Mexican Government and the Mexican Trade Center, the portrait sculpture was cast in Mexico in 2002 and installed on October 9, 2004. It is the most recent statue in the park, and the first to depict a Mexican.

See also

 Benito Juárez (Martinez), installed in Chicago and Houston
 Statue of Benito Juárez (San Diego)

References

2002 establishments in New York City
2002 sculptures
Bronze sculptures in Manhattan
Bryant Park
Monuments and memorials in Manhattan
Outdoor sculptures in Manhattan
Statues in New York City
Sculptures of men in New York City
New York City